Rais Ali Dilavari Dam is a hydroelectric dam in Iran with an installed electricity generating capability of 70 MW. It is situated in Shabankareh, Bushehr Province.

See also

Rais Ali Delvari
List of power stations in Iran

References

External links
 

Hydroelectric power stations in Iran
Buildings and structures in Bushehr Province